The following is the list of Olympic medalists in the sport of judo.

Men

Extra lightweight 
60 kg

Half lightweight 
65 kg (1980–1996)
66 kg (2000–)

Lightweight 
68 kg (1964)
63 kg (1972–1976)
71 kg (1980–1996)
73 kg (2000–)

Half middleweight 
70 kg (1972–1976)
78 kg (1980–1996)
81 kg (2000–)

Middleweight 
80 kg (1964–1976)
86 kg (1980–1996)
90 kg (2000–)

Half heavyweight 
93 kg (1972–1976)
95 kg (1980–1996)
100 kg (2000–)

Heavyweight 
over 80 kg (1964)
over 93 kg (1972–1976)
over 95 kg (1980–1996)
over 100 kg (2000–)

Women

Extra lightweight 
48 kg

Half lightweight 
52 kg

Lightweight 
56 kg (1992–1996)
57 kg (2000–)

Half middleweight 
61 kg (1992–1996)
63 kg (2000–)

Middleweight 
66 kg (1992–1996)
70 kg (2000–)

Half heavyweight 
72 kg (1992–1996)
78 kg (2000–)

Heavyweight 
over 72 kg (1992–1996)
over 78 kg (2000–)

Mixed

Team

Discontinued event

Open class

See also
 List of World Judo Championships medalists
 List of European Judo Championships medalists

References

 International Olympic Committee results database

Judo
medalists

Olympic
Olympic